Connecticut's 2nd State Senate district elects one member to the Connecticut State Senate. The district consists of parts of Bloomfield, Hartford, and Windsor. It is currently represented by Democrat Douglas McCrory, who has served since 2017.

Recent elections

2020

2018

2017 special election

2016

2014

2012

References

02